Andrew P. Canova (October 30, 1835 – December 17, 1909) was a Florida settler and author of Life and Adventures in South Florida.

He was a veteran of the Third Seminole War.

In Fall of 1858, he moved from Tampa Bay to Brevard County where he settled on the Sebastian River. He lived in a palm thatch hut near the mouth of the river. He, along with Ed Marr, hunted, fished and raised onions in a small garden. He started to cultivate citrus, but was impatient and abandoned that project.

Canova went to St. Augustine to enlist in the Confederate Army in 1861.

In 1885 he wrote Life and Adventures in South Florida, in which he lamented the demise of wildlife in the Indian River area.

Canova Beach in Brevard County is not named after this Canova but Carlos Canova, Sr.

See also 
 William F. Russell
 John Caroll Houston, IV

Further reading 
 Read online: Life and Adventures in South Florida.

References 

1835 births
1909 deaths
Florida pioneers
People from Brevard County, Florida
American people of the Seminole Wars
Confederate States Army soldiers
Citrus farmers from Florida
Writers from Tampa, Florida
People from Sebastian, Florida
People from St. Augustine, Florida